Timoteo Jose "Tim" M. Ofrasio S.J., S.L.D. (August 5, 1948 – December 1, 2020) was a Filipino Jesuit Priest and Liturgist from Alaminos, Laguna and Manila.

Biography
He entered the Society of Jesus on 30 July 1969, and was ordained and became a priest on 10 March 1979.

Fr. Tim was also a professor at the Loyola School of Theology at the Ateneo de Manila University in Quezon City where he taught systematic and sacramental theology. He was also an instructor in sacred theology. He obtained licentiate from the Pontificio Istituto Sant’Anselmo in Rome in 1987 and also completed a doctorate degree in sacred liturgy, also from the same institution in 1990 with the dissertation, Baptismal Images in Patristic and Liturgical Sources.

He taught courses in Liturgy and the Sacraments at St. John Vianney Theological Seminary  in Cagayan de Oro City from 1986 to 2004, where he was Spiritual Director (1990–94), Vice-Rector (1994-1998) and Rector (1998–2004). Prior to special studies, he worked in the pastoral field as Associate Pastor of San José Manggagawa Parish in Marikina (1980–82), and Pastor of Our Lady of Perpetual Help Parish in Buug, Zamboanga del Sur (now Zamboanga Sibugay), Prelature (now Diocese) of Ipil (1982–84), and as Associate Pastor in Sacred Heart Parish in Cebu City (2007–08), teaching part time at Seminario Mayor de San Carlos. He was Regional Secretary for East Asia and Oceania (now East Asia and the Pacific) from 2004 to 2005. He is also part of the faculty at Paul VI Institute of Liturgy in Malaybalay (1990-to the present). Fr. Tim joined LST as associate professor in 2008. He was Consultor of the Commission on Liturgy of the CBCP from 1994 to 1997, and Cagayan de Oro Archdiocesan Chair of the Commission on Liturgy from 1994 to 2000, and was consultant to the archdiocese on matters of church architecture.

Fr. Tim is also known as the lyricist for behind many songs used in the liturgy like "Paghahandog ng Sarili", "Isang Bansa", and "Panalangin sa Pagiging Bukas-Palad". This also includes "Alay sa Diyos" which was used during the 2015 Papal Visit to the Philippines. He was also an artist who did paintings and ink and pencil sketches. Fr. Tim also gave the inspiration for the "sampaguita" chasuble used by Pope Francis during his 2015 visit to the Philippines.

He died from COVID-19 at a hospital in San Pablo, Laguna, on 1 December 2020, aged 72, during the COVID-19 pandemic in the Philippines. Fr. Tim was buried at the Sacred Heart Novitiate and Retreat House, Novaliches, Quezon City on 10 July 2021.

References

1948 births
2020 deaths
Liturgists
Linguists from the Philippines
Academic staff of Ateneo de Manila University
21st-century Filipino Jesuits
Deaths from the COVID-19 pandemic in the Philippines
20th-century Filipino Jesuits